Magulacra is a genus of moths in the family Cossidae.

Species
 Magulacra albimacula
 Magulacra cleptes
 Magulacra nigripennata
 Magulacra niveogrisea
 Magulacra notodontoides

References

Natural History Museum Lepidoptera generic names catalog

Cossulinae
Cossidae genera